Paratour is a Canadian/American aircraft manufacturer and flight training school based in Saint-Chrysostome, Quebec and founded by husband and wife team Eric Dufour and Elisabeth Guerin in 1992. The company operates in the winter in Grant-Valkaria, Florida.

Dufour placed first in the 2003, 2005 and 2006 US national paramotor competitions. He also placed first in the engine-out spot landing competition at the 2002  fly-in held in Basse-Ham, France and at the 2003 fly-in held in Pizzo, Calabria, Italy. Dufour ceased competition flying in 2006.

Paratour specializes in the design and manufacture of paramotors and powered parachutes in the form of ready-to-fly aircraft for the US FAR 103 Ultralight Vehicles rules, the Canadian Basic Ultralight Aeroplane and the European Fédération Aéronautique Internationale microlight categories.

The company is known for its 2000-era Paratour SD series of paramotors, now superseded in production by the Paratour Titanium series. The company also builds the Paratour Ultratrike, Paratour SD MiniMax and the propane-powered Paratour Green Eagle powered parachute designs.

The company also acts as a dealer for several brands of paragliders, including APCO, ITV and Paramania.

Aircraft

References

External links

Aircraft manufacturers of the United States
Aircraft manufacturers of Canada
Ultralight aircraft
Powered parachutes
Paramotors